The Movement Coordination Centre Europe (MCCE) is a multinational military movement brokerage centre located on the Eindhoven Airbase at Eindhoven Airport in the Netherlands. Its 29 member states are predominantly drawn from NATO and the European Union (EU). The centre is staffed by military and civilian personnel from the participating countries. The main purpose of the MCCE is coordinating and optimising the usage of military and charter airlift, sealift and land movement assets of the armed forces of the member countries.

History

The genesis of the MCCE began in 1999 when the EU and NATO identified shortfalls in military capability as the world emerged from a cold war environment into a more dynamic expeditionary operational era. The two main findings that led to the founding of the MCCE were a shortage of both strategic airlift and sealift capabilities and the absence of a coordinating body to optimise strategic lift efficiency. At the same time, projects were created to generate additional capacity:  Strategic Airlift Capability (SAC) and Strategic Air Lift International Solution (SALIS) (its centre is co-located in the MCCE) for airlift, and Multinational Sealift Steering Committee (MSCC) for sealift.

The MCCE was officially established on 1 July 2007 as the merger of the earlier European Airlift Centre and the Sealift Coordination Centre. On this date, the initial 15 signatory countries became official members. The MCCE has since been through several cycles of expansion. The MCCE is known as a world-class centre of expertise in the international defence multimodal movement arena, coordinating members’ strategic movement requirements and offers in the most effective and efficient manner.

Participating nations 
MCCE is a non-NATO/non-European Union military organization. MCCE is open to all governments whose membership is unanimously accepted by all the other participant nations, regulated by a specific legal technical agreement. Decisions are taken unanimously with  each member having one vote.

Mission 

MCCE aims to provide for its member nations the most effective coordination of multinational and multimodal strategic lift requirements and air-to-air refuelling against opportunities, in order to maximize the most efficient use of resources, thereby increasing the confidence and visibility of strategic movement plans.

MCCE has to be prepared to provide coordination support to EU and/or NATO operations, and to identify and highlight any potential to optimise participants’ use of air transport, air-to-air refuelling, sea transport, and inland surface transport. This will include the provision of advice for the common usage of commercial charter capabilities, to avoid unnecessary competition for the same resources resulting in increased charter costs.

The MCCE, manned 24/7, acts as a catalyser for strategic lift issues. Its focus is mainly on strategic movements, but not exclude operational and tactical movements. For its members, it represents the aim to avoid wasted capacity on missions, the opportunity to improve joint capabilities and precise, multi-modal plans.

MCCE also must be prepared to provide coordination support to operations of organisations such as the UN to improve efficiency and to provide cost saving alternatives for member nations through identifying available assets, advertising these assets, and then coordinating their use to the maximum extent possible. This coordination support will include requests for support to Peace Support Operations, Disaster Relief and Civil emergency crises. All collaborated movements operate in a reciprocal arrangement which includes cashless compensation for services through the ATARES “Air Transport & Air-to-Air Refuelling and other Exchanges of Services” and SEOS  “Surface Exchange of Services” tools that enhance cooperation by easing the reimbursement process and providing the ability to plan quicker and faster.

Operating concept 
The MCCE’s operating concept works as follows: Nation A has a requirement to transport 90 widgets from point X to point Z by a desired delivery date. The requirement is submitted to the MCCE, and the operational cells will issue the request to all of the member nations. In return, the member nations will submit offers based on their strategic availability and assets to support the request. Nation A selects Nation B, based on nation B being able to fulfil nation A’s requirement in the most beneficial way. Both nations reach an agreement on the specified compensation to be exchanged for the service provided. This can be either in funds paid or an exchange of debits and credits for services rendered. These debits and credits are accrued or reduced based on the mission, distance, cargo, and mode of the movement. Nation B then completes the mission, gaining the agreed upon credit while nation A incurs the debit upon acceptance and completion of mission.

Organisation

Governance 
The MCCE Steering Board (SB) is the highest decision-making body of the MCCE. This Board decides on MCCE participating issues, set Policy guidance, discuss issues recommended by the WB and nominates the Director. This Board is supported by the MCCE Working Board (WB). The WB discusses and controls the routine business related to the MCCE. Every signing Nation has a representative in each of the Boards.

The Director of the MCCE is appointed by the MCCE SB. He manages and directs the MCCE staff in accordance with the Terms of References (TOR’s) and policy set by the MCCE SB.

MCCE Steering Board 
The MCCE Steering Board (SB) is the highest decision making body of the MCCE. It consists of a representative from each of the participating nations, normally at the rank of OF 6 or higher. The Chairman of the SB (CM SB) is a representative of a Participant and is appointed by a decision of the SB and is appointed in general for a period of 1 year.

The SB meets annually and is responsible for:

-         Decide on MCCE participation/membership issues;

-         Set Policy guidance;

-         To discuss issues recommended by the MCCE Working Board (WB);

-         Deciding on proposals for modifications of the TA as compiled by the Working Board;

-         Approving the nomination of the MCCE Director.

MCCE Working Board 
The MCCE Working Board (WB) decides and controls Routine Business related issues.It consists of a representative from each of the participating nations. The WB meets at least every 6 months to enable it to carry out its responsibilities effectively. The Chairman of the WB (CM WB) is a representative of a Participant and is appointed by a decision of the WB. Decisions, including Ex-Committee Decisions, by the WB are taken unanimously. The CM of the MCCE WB will be appointed in general for a period of 2 years.

The WB is responsible for:

-         General policy decisions;

-         Providing direction for the operations of the MCCE;

-         Taking decisions related to the staff structure, peace time establishment and Job Descriptions of the MCCE, as well as the Rotation and Flagging of positions;

-         Approving the budget and other financial decisions;

-         Issuing Performance Measurements (Key Performance Indicators) to MCCE and evaluating and reviewing the performance of the MCCE against these criteria.

MCCE Standing Advisory Working Group

The MCCE Standing Advisory Working Group (SAWG) was formed to investigate and provide advice on matters of relevance to the MCCE Working Board (WB) and the MCCE Steering Board (SB). The MCCE Directorate may also request support from the SAWG, but it must first obtain WB or SB approval to task the SAWG as appropriate.

Directors

Organisational Chart

See also

Eindhoven Airport
Heavy Airlift Wing
European Defence Agency
European Air Group
European Air Transport Command

References

External links
 



Aviation authorities
International military organizations